Jackson is a home rule-class city in and the county seat of Breathitt County, Kentucky, in the United States. The population was 2,231 according to the 2010 U.S. census.

It was the home of the Jackson Academy, which became Lees College.

History
Upon the creation of Breathitt County in 1839, local landowner Simon Cockrell Sr. donated  to serve as its seat of government. The community was originally known as Breathitt, Breathitt Town, or Breathitt Court House after the county, but upon its incorporation as a city by the state legislature in 1843, it was renamed Jackson to honor former president Andrew Jackson.

Local feuds led the national press to publish stories about Jackson and "Bloody Breathitt": state troops were dispatched twice in the 1870s and again in 1903  after the assassination of U.S. Commissioner James B. Marcum on the courthouse steps  to restore order.

The Kentucky Union Railroad reached the city in 1891, and Jackson boomed until the L&N continued the line on to Hazard in 1912. A fire on Halloween, 1913, burned down much of the town.

Geography
Jackson is located at  (37.553012, −83.388249).  The city is nestled in the heart of the Cumberland Plateau of the Appalachian Mountains, with the downtown located on the north bank of the North Fork of the Kentucky River. To limit flooding, the Kentucky River was redirected in 1963 by way of a small cut-through through the mountain, and its former channel, a river meander, was left behind as Panbowl Lake, now a prime attraction for fishermen.

Climate
The climate in this area is characterized by relatively moderate temperatures and evenly distributed precipitation throughout the year. The Köppen climate classification places the city in the humid subtropical zone, which is abbreviated as Cfa. In addition, although the area falls under USDA hardiness zone 6b, the record longest streak without  lows occurred from February 6, 1996 to January 15, 2009.

Precipitation averages  annually, falling on an average 144 days, and the wettest month by normal rainfall is May.

Demographics

As of the census of 2000, there were 2,490 people, 1,005 households, and 661 families residing in the city. The racial makeup of the city was 98.19% White, 0.56% African American, 0.64% Asian, 0.12% from other races, and 0.48% from two or more races. Hispanic or Latino of any race were 0.48% of the population.

There were 1,005 households, out of which 28.9% had children under the age of 18 living with them, 44.4% were married couples living together, 18.2% had a female householder with no husband present, and 34.2% were non-families. 31.4% of all households were made up of individuals, and 12.3% had someone living alone who was 65 years of age or older. The average household size was 2.28 and the average family size was 2.85.

In the city, the population was spread out, with 20.2% under the age of 18, 12.0% from 18 to 24, 26.4% from 25 to 44, 24.9% from 45 to 64, and 16.5% who were 65 years of age or older. The median age was 40 years. For every 100 females, there were 79.1 males. For every 100 females age 18 and over, there were 76.0 males.

The median income for a household in the city was $25,272, and the median income for a family was $33,036. Males had a median income of $33,523 versus $25,179 for females. The per capita income for the city was $13,532. About 21.9% of families and 26.7% of the population were below the poverty line, including 35.3% of those under age 18 and 18.8% of those age 65 or over.

Transportation

Kentucky Routes within the city
 The highway goes north to Campton and the Bert T. Combs Mountain Parkway and south to Hazard and the Hal Rogers Parkway. It is the main artery into the city and, currently, it is being relocated and changed to four lanes around and inside the city. It has been locally named (within the county) as the Breathitt County Veterans Highway.
 The highway goes east to Salyersville and west to Booneville. It merges with KY 15 (at the present time) throughout most of the city. The west end is known, locally, as Booneville Road.
 The highway's eastern terminus starts in the city of Jackson at the intersection with KY 30 and heads west towards Beattyville. It is locally known as Beattyville Road.
 The highway goes north to Mountain Parkway by way of Lee City in Wolfe County and eventually to West Liberty in Morgan County. The highway's southern terminus starts at the intersection of KY 15. Recently, an old section of KY 15 was annexed to the highway, and it is possible, once more of the re-routed KY 15 is finished, that it could annex more of the old KY 15 sections.
 -Not a Primary State Highway – The highway goes north to Campton and south to intersect and end near the KY 15 and KY 30 junction in Jackson. In the north, it connects with KY 205 and follows it until it intersects with the new section of KY 15; it follows KY 15 for a mile and then splits only to intersects KY 15 in Jackson once more; it then breaks away only to connect (partially) with Main Street and then heads south. It is part of what was once the original KY 15 when it was built in 1925. It can be a winding and curvy road in many places with a few hairpin turns as well. It is known locally by different names depending on which road it intersects or what section. i.e. Old Quicksand Rd., Broadway, College Ave, Brown St., Main Street, Washington Ave., Panbowl Rd., and so on.

Airports
 Julian Carroll Airport – (JKL for FAA, none for IATA) – A publicly owned airport off KY 30. It is home to the National Weather Service Forecast Office that oversees most of the eastern part of the state.

Railroads
 CSX is a freight and minerals only line that goes north to Beattyville and eventually to Winchester and south to Hazard. Before CSX owned the line, it was part of the L& N Railway as a passenger and freight line. Before that, it was owned by the defunct Lexington and Eastern Railway Company as a passenger and freight line. The old Jackson Depot and Freight Station located in the South Jackson section on Armory Drive was torn down in the late 1980s.

Education

Oakdale Christian Academy 

https://oakdalechristian.org/

Jackson Independent Schools
 Jackson City School – Elementary, middle and high school combined.

Breathitt County Schools
 Lyndon B. Johnson Elementary (LBJ) – Closed after the 2018 school year. Later demolished in November 2020 to make way for Breathitt Elementary School
 Rousseau Elementary – Closed in 2013 was located in Rousseau
 Marie Roberts – Caney Elementary – Located in Lost Creek
 Highland – Turner Elementary – Located in Canoe
 Eugene Sebastian Middle School – Closed after the '17-18  school year all students relocated to the High School.- located in Jackson
 Breathitt County High School – Located in Jackson

Vocational
 Breathitt County Area Technology Center – On the campus of Breathitt County High School; the vocational school serves both Breathitt County Schools and Jackson Independent Schools.

Post-secondary
 Hazard Community and Technical College, Lees College Campus
 Morehead State University at Jackson – Breathitt County Skills Center
 Kentucky Mountain Bible College – located in Vancleve

Educational Centers
Breathitt County Museum – currently located in the Senior Citizens Center on the second floor.  Through the use of grant money the defunct Breathitt County Jail has been partially renovated to host the museum, but is yet to be completed.
Breathitt County Public Library – located on College Avenue in Jackson.

Festivals
The city of Jackson and Breathitt County are host to many local festivals.

In Jackson:
 Breathitt County Honey Festival – takes place annually (since 1978) during the Labor Day Weekend. It begins on the Thursday before Labor Day and runs through Labor Day.
 Breathitt County Heritage Festival – A recently formed (2005) festival that originally occurred annually on the first weekend of October, and now takes place in conjunction with the July 4th celebration with "Pig Out in the Park."
 Pig Out in the Park/Independence Day Celebration – Held at Douthitt Park; July 4 celebration
 Downtown Christmas – Parade and festivities held around the first weekend of December.

Other festivals that occur outside the city but in Breathitt County: 
 Morris Fork Crafts Fair, one of the oldest fairs in the area
 The Crockettsville Charity Concert and Ride, hosted by the band Halfway to Hazard  (Unfortunately, this event has not occurred the last couple years and the hosts announced in 2016 they will secure a new venue for this concert and trail ride in the future.)

Notable people
 Jay Huguely, television producer of Magnum PI
 Daniel Noble, Medal of Honor recipient for his service during American Civil War
 Jeffrey Reddick, screenwriter of Final Destination
 Marea Stamper, DJ, Producer, Musician under the stage name The Blessed Madonna
 Willie Sandlin, Medal of Honor recipient for his service during World War I
 Sturgill Simpson, country singer
 Chad Warrix, country singer of Halfway to Hazard
 The family of J. D. Vance, author of Hillbilly Elegy, was from Jackson, "the spiritual mountain home of the Vances," and Vance spent summers there growing up.

References

External links
 Breathitt County, Kentucky 
 Jackson at kyhometown.com
 Breathitt County

 

Cities in Breathitt County, Kentucky
Cities in Kentucky
County seats in Kentucky
Populated places established in 1839
1839 establishments in Kentucky